Nallu is a village and former Village Development Committee that is now part of Konjyosom Rural Municipality in Province No. 3 of central Nepal. At the time of the 1991 Nepal census it had a population of 1849 living in 320 individual households. Most of the people here are from Tamang Cast. According to the report taken 96.7% people are Tamang.

References

External links
UN map of the municipalities of Lalitpur District

Populated places in Lalitpur District, Nepal